The men's 4 × 100 metres relay event at the 1952 Olympic Games took place on July 26 & July 27.  The United States team  won the final.

Results

Heats
The first round was held on July 26. The three fastest teams from each heat qualified to the semifinals.

Heat 1

Heat 2

Heat 3

Heat 4

Semifinals
The semifinals were held on July 27. The three fastest teams from each heat advanced to the final

Heat 1

Heat 2

Final

References

Men's 4x100 metre relay
Relay foot races at the Olympics
4 × 100 metres relay
Men's events at the 1952 Summer Olympics